Meade State Park is a state park southwest of the city of Meade in Meade County, Kansas, United States. The park features an  lake that contains Bluegill, Channel Cat & Flathead Catfish, Trout, Saugeye, Crappie, and Largemouth Bass. Fishing is allowed in the lake year-round with motorized boating restricted to fishing only and no wake speed. In addition the park encompasses a  campsite and wildlife area. This can be enjoyed via hiking trails located within the park.

See also
 List of Kansas state parks
 List of lakes, reservoirs, and dams in Kansas
 List of rivers of Kansas

References

External links
 Meade State Park

State parks of Kansas